Wolfhouse Run is a tributary of Little Fishing Creek in Columbia County, Pennsylvania, in the United States. The steam is considered to be an Exceptional Value stream and a Coldwater Fishery. However, it is considered to be impaired as well. At least two bridges and one sawmill have been built over or on the stream.

Course

Wolfhouse Run begins near Wolfhouse Hollow Road in a valley in Pine Township. It flows south-southwest for a few tenths of a mile, crossing the road. The stream then turns south and slightly west and begins to flow parallel to Wolfhouse Hollow Road for nearly a mile. Its valley gradually deepens in this area. The stream then turns south-southwest, still flowing parallel to Wolfhouse Hollow Road, for a few tenths of a mile. It then turns south-southeast for more than a mile and continues to flow parallel to Wolfhouse Hollow Road. Eventually, the stream reaches its confluence with Little Fishing Creek at the border between Pine Township and Greenwood Township.

Geography and hydrology

Wolfhouse Run is considered to be impaired by road runoff for its entire length. However, a total maximum daily load has not been created for the stream.

Watershed
The watershed of the stream is in the Lower North Branch Susquehanna River drainage basin.

Wolfhouse Run is in the United States Geological Survey quadrangle of Lairdsville. The mouth of the stream is in the west-central portion of Greenwood Township. Additionally, the stream is near Millville.

History and etymology
Wolfhouse Run was entered into the Geographic Names Information System on August 2, 1979. Its identifier in the Geographic Names Information System is 1191700.

A sawmill was constructed on Wolfhouse Run by Richard Greenly in 1835. However, it was destroyed by a cloudburst in June 1836. Greenly returned to the area and rebuilt the sawmill in 1841. J.L. Eves was the final owner of the sawmill. A number of bridges have also been built over the stream. A steel stringer bridge was built over Wolfhouse Run in 1952 and repaired in 2003. It was repaired in 1988.

Wolfhouse Run is commonly thought to be named after a den of wolves. However, it is actually named after a cabin owned by a family named Wolf.

Biology
Wolfhouse Run is designated as an Exceptional Value stream. Wild trout inhabit the stream and it is designated by the Pennsylvania Fish and Boat Commission as a wild trout stream.

See also
Lick Run (Little Fishing Creek), next tributary of Little Fishing Creek going downstream
Devil Hole Run, next tributary of Little Fishing Creek going upstream
List of tributaries of Fishing Creek (North Branch Susquehanna River)

References

Rivers of Columbia County, Pennsylvania
Tributaries of Fishing Creek (North Branch Susquehanna River)
Rivers of Pennsylvania